Tompkinsville may refer to:

Tompkinsville, Kentucky
Tompkinsville, Maryland
Tompkinsville, Staten Island, New York
 Tompkinsville (Staten Island Railway station)